Amina Zaydan (born 1966) is an Egyptian novelist and short story writer. She was born in 1966 in Suez and now lives in Cairo where she works as a civil servant.

Zaydan is known for her strong stand on gender inequality in her writings. In 1994, her short story collection entitled It Happened Secretly won first prize in a literary competition held by Gamal al-Ghitani's Akhbar al-Adab weekly newspaper. It also won the prize for Best Short Story Collection at the Cairo International Book Fair the following year. She has since published a further volume of short stories called Fawda and several novels. Her second novel Red Wine won the Naguib Mahfouz Medal in 2007. An English translation of Red Wine by Sally Gomaa was published by the AUC Press in 2010.

References

People from Suez
1966 births
Egyptian novelists
Egyptian women short story writers
Egyptian short story writers
Living people
Recipients of the Naguib Mahfouz Medal for Literature
International Writing Program alumni
20th-century Egyptian women writers
20th-century Egyptian writers
20th-century short story writers
21st-century Egyptian women writers
21st-century Egyptian writers
21st-century novelists
21st-century short story writers